Bertrand L. Gulick, Jr. (March 20, 1898 – December 9, 1972) was an American football player and businessman. 

He played at the tackle position for the Syracuse Orange football team. He was selected by the United Press, International News Service, and The New York Times as a first-team player on their 1920 College Football All-America Team.

Gulick later served in the Army during World War II. He also owned and operated the Gulick Agency, a life insurance agency in New Jersey. He was also a farmer and real estate broker. He also served as a Princeton committeeman and a member of the Mercer County Executive Committee.

References

1898 births
1972 deaths
American football tackles
Syracuse Orange football players
All-American college football players
People from Princeton, New Jersey
Players of American football from New Jersey